Pestel may refer to:

People
 Eduard Pestel (1914–1988), German economist, politician, and professor of mechanics
 François Pestel (1763–1828), French naval architect
 Gottfried Pestel (1654–1732), German composer and organist
 Pavel Pestel (1793–1826), revolutionary leader in Russia's 1825 revolt

Other uses
 Pestel, Grand'Anse, a commune in Haïti
 Pestèl City, the principal town of Pestèl commune
 PEST analysis, a schematic for engaging in macro-environmental analysis and research

See also
 Pestle, a blunt club-shaped object used for grinding solids